Sir Robert Spiller (c. 1591–1637)  was an English landowner and politician who sat in the House of Commons between 1621 and 1624.

Early life 
Spiller was the son of Sir Henry Spiller of Laleham. He matriculated at Trinity College, Oxford on 25 January 1610 aged 18 and was awarded BA on 28 January 1611.

Career 
He was a student of Lincoln's Inn in 1611 and became a clerk in Chancery.

In 1621 he was elected Member of Parliament for Castle Rising.  He was of Sutton in Surrey and was knighted at Guildford on 27 July 1622  together with Sir Richard Weston. In 1624 he was elected MP for Castle Rising again. 
 
In 1635 Spiller was one of the commissioners appointed for the Wey Navigation.

Personal life 
Spiller married  Elizabeth (or Dorothy) Dormer, daughter of Sir John Dormer. They had a daughter Jane who married James Herbert son of Philip Herbert, 4th Earl of Pembroke.

Spiller died at the age of about 47 and was buried at Shepperton, Middlesex on 21 May 1637.

References

1591 births
1637 deaths
Members of Lincoln's Inn
English MPs 1621–1622
English MPs 1624–1625